

Date
In Denmark, the official standard is  ISO 8601 but it is not widely used compared to the traditionally used standard  (e.g.,  for Christmas Eve and 1.5.2006 or 01.05.2006 for Labour Day), which is by far the most common system. Dots and hyphens are the most common separators, although using both a stroke and hyphen is sometimes used, especially in handwriting (e.g. 24/12-2005). According to the official rules in Retskrivningsordbogen, there shall not be zeros before 1 and 5 in the date , but it is quite common with them: .

Days and months are written in lower case, often beginning with the definite article "den" (or abbreviated "d."), e.g. "mandag() d. 4. januar" ("Monday the 4th of January").

Week numbering is also very common both written and orally, albeit less so in private life.

The week always begins on Mondays and ends on Sundays.

ISO 8601 has been adopted as Danish national standard DS/ISO 8601, but it is not widely used.

Time 
Written time is almost always in the 24-hour clock. In spoken language, a mixture of the two systems are used:
 When giving exact times, or when speaking in official settings (radio, TV, etc.), the 24-hour clock is always used.
 When speaking informally, the 12-hour clock is often used. Minutes are usually rounded off to the nearest five minutes. In these styles, the word for "minutes" is usually but not always left out. For example (transliterated into English):
 Six (6 am or pm)
 20 (minutes) past seven
 10 (minutes) to eight
 A quarter past nine
 A quarter to eleven
 Half two (1:30)
 Five to half three (2:25)
 Five past half four (3:35)

References

Time in Denmark
Date and time representation by country